, better known by the stage name Kenn (stylized as KENN), is a Japanese actor, voice actor and singer from Tokyo, Japan. He made his debut as a voice actor in 2004 in the Japanese anime Yu-Gi-Oh! GX (Yu-Gi-Oh! Duel Monsters GX in Japan) as Jaden Yuki, the protagonist of the series and his most known role. He also performed in the musical adaptation of the popular sports anime The Prince of Tennis as Yuta Fuji, the younger brother of Seigaku's Shusuke Fuji. He was the vocalist and keyboardist of the rock band The NaB's in 2003 until October 2006 before it was suspended, leading him to pursue a solo career in 2009. KENN played the part of Ikuto in the musical adaptation of Peach Pit's manga Shugo Chara.

As a composer, he uses the alias Kenn Kato.

On August 19, 2021, it was announced KENN tested positive for COVID-19, and would be skipping a few activities in the following days.

Filmography

Animated television series
 2004
 Yu-Gi-Oh! GX (Jaden Yuki)

 2006
 Air Gear (Kazuma Mikura)
 Digimon Savers (Kouki Tsubasa, BioThunderbirmon, Darkdramon)
 Katekyo Hitman Reborn! (Dino)

 2008
 Live On Cardliver Kakeru (Chikara Akamaru)
 The Tower of Druaga: The Aegis of Uruk (Jil)

 2009
 Fresh Pretty Cure! (Kazuki Ichijo)
 Miracle Train: ōedo-sen e Yōkoso (Fumi Roppongi)
 The Tower of Druaga: The Sword of Uruk (Jil)

 2010
 Black Butler II (Ronald Knox)
 Jewelpet Twinkle (Jasper)
 The Legend of the Legendary Heroes (Lafra)

 2011
 Jewelpet Sunshine (Jasper)
 Last Exile: Fam, The Silver Wing (Dinesh (eps 12-13); Fritz)
 Pretty Rhythm Aurora Dream (Hibiki)
 Toriko (Takimaru)

2012
 Ginga e Kickoff!! (Kota Furuya)
 Hunter × Hunter (Second Series) (Phinks)
 Jewelpet Kira☆Deco—! (Jasper)
 Monsuno (Chase Suno)
 Pretty Rhythm Dear My Future (Hibiki)
 Uchū Kyōdai (Hibito Nanba)

2013
Ace of Diamond (Carlos Toshiki Kamiya)
Assassination Classroom OVA (Hiroto Maehara)
Brothers Conflict (Asahina Fūto)
Beyond the Boundary (Akihito Kanbara)
 Jewelpet Happiness (Jasper)
Kyōkai no Kanata: Idol Saiban! - Mayoi Nagara mo Kimi o Sabaku Tami (ONA) Akihito Kanbara (eps 1, 3)
Mushibugyo (Jinbei Tsukishima)
Neppu Kairiku Bushi Road (Suo Yagyu)
Samurai Flamenco (Kuroki Anji)

2014
Akatsuki no Yona (Tae-woo)
Ao Haru Ride (Kominato Aya)
Baby Steps (Yoshiaki Ide)
Black Butler ~Book of Circus~ (Ronald Knox)
Lady Jewelpet (Miura)
Majin Bone (Shōgo Ryūjin)
Mushibugyo OVA (Jinbei Tsukishima)
Parasyte -the maxim- (Mitsuo)
Space Dandy (Isaac)
Terra Formars (Alex Kandley Stewart)

2015
Ace of Diamond 2nd Season (Carlos Toshiki Kamiya)
Baby Steps Season 2 (Yoshiaki Ide)
Durarara!!x2 Ten (Eijiro Sharaku)
Macross Delta (Bogue Con-Vaart)
The Heroic Legend of Arslan (Gieve)
Star-Myu: High School Star Musical (Izumi Toraishi)

2016
Ajin (Watanabe (eps 1-2))
The Heroic Legend of Arslan: Dust Storm Dance (Gieve)
Days (Himura Mayumi)
Divine Gate (Uwain)
Durarara!!x2 Ketsu (Eijiro Sharaku)
Izetta: The Last Witch (Hans)
Macross Delta (Bogue Con-Vaart)
Magic★Kyun! Renaissance (Aoi Suminomiya)
Scared Rider Xechs (Mutsuki Hijiri)
Terra Formars: Revenge (Alex Kandley Stewart)
Tsukiuta. The Animation (Aoi Satsuki)
Twin Star Exorcists (Yamato)

2017
Kenka Bancho Otome: Girl Beats Boys (Totomaru Minowa)
Marginal 4: Kiss kara Tsukuru Big Bang (L Nomura)
My Hero Academia (Native)
Altair: A Record of Battles (Kyros γιός Apollodorus)
Star-Myu: High School Star Musical 2 (Izumi Toraishi)
Children of the Whales (Rohalito No Amonrogia)

2018
Black Clover (Vermillion Leopold)
Butlers: Chitose Momotose Monogatari (Yuki Fujishiro)
Hoshin Engi (Ko Tenka)
IDOLiSH7 (Tamaki Yotsuba)
Piano no Mori (Lev Shimanovski)

2019
Meiji Tokyo Renka (Hishida Shunsou)
Afterlost (Rui)
JoJo's Bizarre Adventure: Golden Wind (Secco)
Ace of Diamond Act II (Carlos Toshiki Kamiya)
YU-NO: A Girl Who Chants Love at the Bound of this World (Abel)
Star-Myu: High School Star Musical 3 (Izumi Toraishi)
Is It Wrong to Try to Pick Up Girls in a Dungeon? II (Hyakinthos Clio)
Try Knights (Akira Kariya)
Demon Slayer: Kimetsu no Yaiba (Kamanue)
Ahiru no Sora (Masahiro Saki)
My Hero Academia 4 (Toya Setsuno)

2020
IDOLiSH7 Second Beat! (Tamaki Yotsuba)
Tsukiuta. The Animation 2 (Aoi Satsuki)

2021
I-Chu: Halfway Through the Idol (Seiya Aido)
Cells at Work! Code Black (Red Blood Cell)
IDOLiSH7 Third Beat! (Tamaki Yotsuba)
Muteking the Dancing Hero (Suteking)

2022
Platinum End (Penema)
Bleach: Thousand-Year Blood War (Berenice Gabrielli)
Eternal Boys (Ui Hakosaka)
Mobile Suit Gundam: The Witch from Mercury (Ojelo Gabel)

Anime films
 Yonna in the Solitary Fortress (2006), Garuda
 Yu-Gi-Oh!: Bonds Beyond Time (2010), Judai Yuki
 Eiga Jewelpet Sweets Dance Princess (2012), Jasper
 Hunter × Hunter: Phantom Rouge (2013), Phinks
 Uchū Kyōdai#0 (2014), Hibito Nanba
 Kyoukai no Kanata Movie: I'll Be Here - Kako-hen (2015), Akihito Kanbara
 Kyoukai no Kanata Movie: I'll Be Here - Mirai-hen (2015), Akihito Kanbara
 Gekijōban Meiji Tokyo Renka: Yumihari no Serenade (2015), Hishida Shunsou
 Black Butler: Book of the Atlantic (2017), Ronald Knox

Original net animation
 Cap Kakumei Bottleman (2020), Ryō Hokari
 Oshiete Hokusai!: The Animation (2021), Kōrin Ogata
 Super Crooks (2021), Forecast
 Cyberpunk: Edgerunners (2022), David

Tokusatsu
2014
 Ressha Sentai ToQger the Movie: Galaxy Line S.O.S. (Hound Shadow)

Drama CD
  (Ciel)
 The Demon Prince of Momochi House (Aoi Nanamori/Nue)
 The Demon Prince of Momochi House Part 2 (Aoi Nanamori/Nue)
 The Demon Prince of Momochi House Part 3 (Aoi Nanamori/Nue
 You Got Me, Sempai! (Higuchi)

Game
 Blazer Drive (Daichi)
 Brothers Conflict: Brilliant Blue (Fūto Asahina)
 Brothers Conflict: Passion Pink (Fūto Asahina)
 Bustafellows (Limbo Fitzgerald)
 Cupid Parasite (Shelby Snail)
 Desert Kingdom (Sera)
 Desert Kingdom Portable (Sera)
 Destiny Child (Frej)
 Double Score 〜Marguerite×Tulip〜 (Tomu)
 Dragalia Lost (Harle, Karl)
 Soukai Buccaneers! (Crave Foster)
 Ken ga Kimi (Kei)
 Ken ga Kimi: Momoyo Tsuzuri (Kei)
 The Exorcism of Maria la Campanella (Joker)
 The Exorcism of Maria (Joker)
 Final Fantasy XIV: A Realm Reborn (Urianger, Wedge and Isse)
 Final Fantasy XIV: Heavensward (Urianger)
 Final Fantasy XIV: Stormblood (Urianger)
 Final Fantasy XIV: Shadowbringers (Urianger)
 Glass Heart Princess (Shinnosuke Masaki)
 Glass Heart Princess: Platinum (Shinnosuke Masaki)
 Hakuouki Urakata (Katsura Kogorou)
 I Doll U (Ruka)
 I-Chu (Seiya Aido)
 Boyfriend(kari) (Shota Kitagawa)
 IDOLiSH7 (Tamaki Yotsuba)
 Bungo to Alchemist (Saneatsu "Musha" Mushanokōji)
 Jewelic Nightmare (Adamas/Sumeragi Seiichirou)
 Magic★Kyun! Renaissance (Aoi Suminomiya)
 Marginal#4 Idol of Supernova (L Nomura)
 Kin'iro no Corda 3 AnotherSky (Aoba Kuramochi)
 Meiji Tokyo Renka (Hishida Shunsou)
 Meiji Tokyo Renka Twilight Kiss (Hishida Shunsou)
 Minus Eight (Kuramochi Aoba)
 Onmyoji (Kidoumaru)
 Pokémon Masters (Brawly)
 Renai Banchou, Koi Seyo Otome! Love is Power (Sawayaka Banchou)
 Reine des Fleurs (Orpheus)
 Phoenix Wright: Ace Attorney - Dual Destinies (Apollo Justice, Clay Terran)
 Phoenix Wright: Ace Attorney - Spirit of Justice (Apollo Justice)
 Sacred Rider Xechs (Hijiri Mutsuki)
 Sacred Rider Xechs -STARDUST LOVERS- (Hijiri Mutsuki)
 Sacred Rider Xechs 1 + FD Portable (Hijiri Mutsuki)
 Shining Force Feather (Rash)
 Soulcalibur V (Patroklos Alexander)
 Stand My Heroes (Shion Hinata)
 Tenkaichi★Sengoku LOVERS DS (Keiji Maeda)
 The King of Fighters XV (Krohnen McDougall (K9999))
 The King of Fighters All Star (Krohnen)
 Tsukino Paradise (Aoi Satsuki)
 Un:Birthday Song ~Ai o Utau Shinigami~ (Shizuru Hayasaka)
 Photograph Journey (Mizuki Saikusa)
 Vitamin XtoZ (Tenjuro Narumiya)
 VitaminZ (Tenjuro Narumiya)
 VitaminZ Graduation (Tenjuro Narumiya)
 VitaminZ Revolution (Tenjuro Narumiya)
 Yunohana SpRING! (Kintaro Katagiri)
 Yunohana Spring! Cherishing Time (Kintaro Katagiri)
 Gakuen Club ~Houkago no Himitsu~ (Asahi Minakawa)
 Marginal #4 Road to Galaxy (L Nomura)
 Magical Days The Brats' Parade (Kaworu Kanno)
 Master Detective Archives: Rain Code (Desuhiko Thunderbolt)
 Akane sasu Sekai de Kimi to Utau (Takasugi Shinsaku)
 Kenka Banchou Otome (Totomaru Minowa)
 Kenka Banchou Otome ~Kanzen Muketsu no My Honey~ (Totomaru Minowa)
 Ren'ai Princess ~Nisemono Hime to 10-nin no Kon'yakusha~ (Abel Oakwood)
 Fortissimo (Fūto Asahina)
 League of Legends (Kayn)
 Xenoblade Chronicles 2 (Perceval/Vasara)
 Yu-Gi-Oh! Arc-V Tag Force Special  (Jaden Yuki)
 Yu-Gi-Oh! Cross Duel (Jaden Yuki)
 Yu-Gi-Oh! Duel Links  (Jaden Yuki)
 Yu-Gi-Oh! GX Tag Force  (Jaden Yuki)
 Yu-Gi-Oh! GX Tag Force 2  (Jaden Yuki)
 Yu-Gi-Oh! GX Tag Force 3  (Jaden Yuki)
 Ys VIII: Lacrimosa of Dana (Hummel Trabaldo)
  Fire Emblem Engage (Fogato)

Dubbing

Live-actionThe Adventurer: The Curse of the Midas Box (Mariah Mundi (Aneurin Barnard))Cinderella (John (James Acaster))The Favourite (Samuel Masham (Joe Alwyn))Gossip Girl (Akeno "Aki" Menzies (Evan Mock))Haute Cuisine (Nicolas Bauvois (Arthur Dupont))Jumanji: Welcome to the Jungle (Jefferson "Seaplane" McDonough (Nick Jonas))Keys to the Heart (Jin-tae (Park Jung-min))The Knight of Shadows: Between Yin and Yang (Yan Fei (Austin Lin))Lights Out (Bret (Alexander DiPersia))Mortdecai (Maurice (Guy Burnet))Operation Proposal (Kang Baek-ho (Yoo Seung-ho))Ready Player One (Wade Watts / Parzival (Tye Sheridan))Resident Alien (Ben Hawthorne (Levi Fiehler))Stalker's Prey (Bruce Kane (Mason Dye))Your Honor (Adam Desiato (Hunter Doohan))

AnimationPlaymobil: The Movie (Emperor Maximus)Trolls (Branch)

 Stage appearances 
TENIMYU: THE PRINCE OF TENNIS MUSICAL SERIES (as Yuta Fuji)
 The Prince of Tennis Musical: More than Limit St. Rudolph Gauken (2004)
 The Prince of Tennis Musical: Side Yamabuki feat. St. Rudolph (In Winter of 2004-2005)
 The Prince of Tennis Musical: Dream Live 2nd (2005)
 The Prince of Tennis Musical: The Imperial Match Hyotei (guest) (2005)
 The Prince of Tennis Musical: The Imperial Match Hyotei in Winter (In Winter of 2005-2006)
 The Prince of Tennis Musical: The Final Match Rikkai Second feat. the Rivals (2009-2010)
 The Prince of Tennis Musical: Dream Live 7th (2010)

Musical Air Gear (as Kazu)
 Musical Air Gear (2007)
 Musical Air Gear: Musical Air Gear vs. Bacchus Super Range Remix (2007)
 Musical Air Gear: Musical Air Gear vs. Bacchus Top Gear Remix (2010)

Shugo Chara the Musical (2009) (as Ikuto Tsukiyomi)

Rebocon (2010-2011) (as Dino)

Magdara na Maria (as Baron Carl)

Discography
 Livin' On the Edge SLASH THE LIFE Miracle Train Character Song Vol.1 Black Butler II Character Song Vol.10 Beyond the Boundary Character Song Vol.2''

References

External links
 Official agency profile 
 
 

1982 births
Living people
Japanese male pop singers
Japanese male stage actors
Japanese male video game actors
Japanese male voice actors
Male voice actors from Tokyo
Singers from Tokyo
21st-century Japanese male actors
21st-century Japanese singers
21st-century Japanese male singers